Jang Dong-yoon (born July 12, 1992) is a South Korean actor. He is best known for his leading roles in the popular television series School 2017 (2017), The Tale of Nokdu (2019), and Search (2020).

Early life
After finishing high school, Jang began his mandatory military service in May 2012 and was discharged in February 2014.

Career

2015: Beginnings
In 2015, while studying at Hanyang University, Jang was reported in the media for his bravery. It was reported that he had come across a robber with a lethal weapon threatening a convenience store clerk in Seoul's Gwanak District, and that he devised a quick plan to have the culprit arrested. He was recognized with a commendation from the Seoul Metropolitan Police Agency for this act of heroism. This popularity later led to him receiving many casting offers.

2016–2018: Acting debut
In 2016, Jang debuted as an actor with the Naver web drama, Women at a Game Company. Later that year he was cast in the teen-mystery drama Solomon's Perjury.

In 2017, he joined as one of the main casts of the KBS teen-romance drama School 2017. The same year, he starred in the KBS Drama Special, If We Were a Season. 

In 2018, he was cast in the leading role for tvN's medical drama A Poem a Day. The same year, he played a supporting role in the historical drama Mr. Sunshine. He also made his silver screen debut with the indie film Beautiful Days which opened the 23rd Busan International Film Festival, where he played as Lee Na-young's son. In December, he starred in the youth drama Just Dance for which he won the Best Actor in a One Act/Special/Short Drama – Excellence Award during the 2018 KBS Drama Awards.

2019–present: Rising popularity 
[[File:2019 KBS 연기대상 조선로코 녹두전.png|thumb|right|Jang and Kim So-hyun as the main actors for The Tale of Nokdu.]]
In 2019, Jang starred in the historical romantic comedy drama titled The Tale of Nokdu along with actress Kim So-hyun. He gained recognition and increased popularity for his role as the cross-dressing protagonist. He won the Excellence Award- Actor in a Miniseries at the 2019 KBS Drama Awards and Best New Actor award at the 7th APAN Star Awards. 

In 2020, he was cast in another indie film, Run Boy Run by director Oh Won-jae. He also starred in South Korea's first military thriller drama set in the demilitarized zone, Search as a military dog handler.

In 2021, Joseon Exorcist, a show where Jang Dong-yoon was one of the leading stars, was cancelled after airing two episodes during the controversy over historical inaccuracies, such as incorrect use of Chinese traditional props. Actors began to delete drama-related SNS posts and Jang Dong-yoon was the first among the actors to post his position and apology. Later in October 2021, it was announced that the animated film Tae-il featuring Jang's voice will be released in December 2021.

In 2022, Jang returned to the big screen with the film Project Wolf Hunting'', a return to the big screen in a year.

Philanthropy 
On August 30, 2022, Jang donated 6 million won in scholarship money to his father's retirement ceremony.

Filmography

Film

Television series

Web series

Television shows

Hosting

Music videos appearances

Ambassadorship 
 Ambassador for 2022 Unobstructed Films (2021)

Awards and nominations

References

External links
 DongyiCompany.Official (Official Agency account on Instagram)
jangdongyoon.jp (Official Japanese website) 

1992 births
Living people
People from Daegu
21st-century South Korean male actors
South Korean male television actors
South Korean male film actors
Hanyang University alumni